Stanisława may refer to:
Stanisława, Polish feminine form for the name Stanisław
Stanisława, Greater Poland Voivodeship, a village in western-central Poland